Collana is a location in the La Paz Department in Bolivia. It is the seat of the Collana Municipality, the seventh municipal section of the Aroma Province.

References 

 Instituto Nacional de Estadística de Bolivia

Populated places in La Paz Department (Bolivia)